Benjamin Harrison Freedman (October 4, 1890 – May 1984) was an American businessman, Holocaust denier, and vocal anti-Zionist. Born in a Jewish family, he converted from Judaism to Roman Catholicism. Outside of political activism, Freedman was a partner in a dermatological institute and investor for small businesses.

Biography
From 1925 to 1937, Freedman was a partner with Samuel D. Leidesdorf in the John H. Woodbury Laboratories, a dermatological institute and a derivative company of the old Woodbury Soap Company. Benjamin H Freedman was listed on the letterhead of the Institute for Arab American Affairs and around 1946, along with his wife, listed as "R M Schoendorf" (Rose M. Schoendorf Freedman), "sponsored a series of advertisements under the imprint of 'The League for Peace with Justice in Palestine'". In 1946, he sued the American Jewish Committee for libel and the case was thrown out in less than a month.

In 1988, the Institute for Historical Review, an organization which propagated Holocaust denial, published Robert John's Behind the Balfour Declaration, including a single acknowledgment to Freedman. John wrote that Freedman "gave me copies of materials on the Balfour Declaration, which I might never have found on my own and (he) encouraged my own research."

Activities

He was a financial backer of the author Conde McGinley, publisher of the antisemitic  periodical Common Sense. In the 1955 libel trial by Rabbi Joachim Prinz against McGinley, Freedman testified that "he [Freedman] had given Mr. McGinley financial support of 'more than $10,000 but less than $100,000'". Prinz had sued McGinley for calling him a "red rabbi."

At the Henry George School, Benjamin Freedman spoke on "The Genesis of Middle East Tensions". Long John Nebel reported on WNBC that Freedman would discuss anti-Semitism. Freedman was politically active until the mid-1970s when he was well over 85 years old. He died in May 1984 at the age of 94.

Freedman opposed the nomination of Anna M. Rosenberg to be United States Assistant Secretary of Defense in 1950. An article in the ADL Bulletin titled The Plot Against Ann Rosenberg attributed the attacks on Rosenberg's loyalty to "professional anti-Semites and lunatic nationalists", including the "Jew-baiting cabal of John Rankin, Benjamin Freedman, and Gerald Smith".
Freedman, an apostate Jew, was well known to the Anti-Defamation League and the American Jewish Committee as an active supporter of the Arab cause in the Middle East. (fn 33) In the course of his erratic and often contradictory testimony before the Senate committee, Freedman revealed the roles played by anti-Semitic agitators and right-wing anticommunists — including Gerald L. K. Smith, Conde McGinley, the "Reverend" Wesley Swift, Congressman John Rankin, Senator Joseph McCarthy, and J. B. Matthews — in the campaign against the Rosenberg appointment. (fn 34)

He is mentioned in a report by the House Un-American Activities Committee.

Works
 League for Peace With Justice in Palestine. Freedman published his own broadsheets under the aegis of the League for Peace With Justice in Palestine, which he founded in 1946.
"Palestine," Destiny: The Magazine of National Life (Jan. 1948): 26–28 (originally appeared in the National Economic Council's Letter, no. 177, Oct. 15, 1947). Haverhill, Mass.
 Facts are Facts, Noontide Press (Softcover), . A pamphlet purporting to be the text of a 1954 letter from Freedman to David Goldstein, proponent of the idea that Christianity fulfilled Judaism. The text expounds the notion that most people now identified as Jews are descendants of Khazars, a Turkic people of Central Asia who converted to Judaism. Freedman does not refer to Jews, but to "so-called or 'self-styled Jews'".
 Why Congress is Crooked or Crazy or Both, Founder, 1946, League for Peace with Justice in Palestine (New York, 1975)

Notes

Resources
Hall, Gordon D., The Hate Campaign Against the UN. Beacon Press, 1952. 
Nomination of Anna M. Rosenberg to be Assistant Secretary of Defense 
Griffith, Robert K. The Politics of Fear: Joseph R. McCarthy and the Senate, University of Massachusetts Press, 1987, 
Svonkin, Stuart. Jews Against Prejudice:American Jews and the Fight for Civil Liberties, Columbia University Press 1997. 
House Committee on un-American Activities, 1954  — from the Eugene V. Debs collection (3 megabytes)

External links

The audio of the 1961 Willard Hotel speech in its entirety is 87 minutes long:
The speech in its entirety
Abridged version (46 min)
transcript
Benjamin Freedman's FBI files, obtained under the Freedom of Information Act and hosted at the Internet Archive:
FBI headquarters file
New York City office file part 1
New York City office file part 2

1890 births
1984 deaths
20th-century American businesspeople
20th-century Roman Catholics
Activists from New York City
American Holocaust deniers
American political activists
Anti-Zionism in the United States
Businesspeople from New York City
Catholics from New York (state)
Converts to Roman Catholicism from Judaism